Arthur Cohn's irreducibility criterion is a sufficient condition for a polynomial to be irreducible in —that is, for it to be unfactorable into the product of lower-degree polynomials with integer coefficients.

The criterion is often stated as follows:

The theorem can be generalized to other bases as follows:

The base 10 version of the theorem is attributed to Cohn by Pólya and Szegő in one of their books while the generalization to any base b is due to Brillhart, Filaseta, and Odlyzko.

In 2002, Ram Murty gave a simplified proof as well as some history of the theorem in a paper that is available online.

A further generalization of the theorem allowing coefficients larger than digits was given by Filaseta and Gross. In particular, let  be a polynomial with non-negative integer coefficients such that  is prime. Moreover, they proved that this bound is also sharp. In other words, coefficients larger than 49598666989151226098104244512918 do not guarantee irreducibility. The method of Filaseta and Gross was also generalized to provide similar sharp bounds for some other bases by Cole, Dunn, and Filaseta.

The converse of this criterion is that, if p is an irreducible polynomial with integer coefficients that have greatest common divisor 1, then there exists a base such that the coefficients of p form the representation of a prime number in that base; this is the Bunyakovsky conjecture and its truth or falsity remains an open question.

Historical notes
Polya and Szegő gave their own generalization but it has many side conditions (on the locations of the roots, for instance) so it lacks the elegance of Brillhart's, Filaseta's, and Odlyzko's generalization.
It is clear from context that the "A. Cohn" mentioned by Polya and Szegő is Arthur Cohn (1894–1940), a student of Issai Schur who was awarded his doctorate from Frederick William University in 1921.

See also

Eisenstein's criterion
Perron's irreducibility criterion

References

External links

Polynomials
Theorems in algebra